Peter E. Kennedy (1943–2010) was a Canadian economist who taught for many years at the Simon Fraser University. His most famous work was his noted textbook, A Guide to Econometrics. In this guide, and in a subsequent summary article, he produced Ten Commandments of Applied Econometrics. These are that Thou shalt:
 Use common sense and economic theory
 Ask the right question
 Know the context
 Inspect the data
 Not worship complexity
 Look long and hard at thy results
 Beware the costs of data mining
 Be willing to compromise
 Not confuse statistical significance with substance
 Confess in the presence of sensitivity.

He was born in Toronto and grew up close by in Port Credit. He was educated at Queen's University, graduating in 1965, and at the University of Wisconsin-Madison, where he received his Ph.D. in 1968. He worked briefly at Cornell University in 1968 before moving to Simon Fraser University that same year. He remained at SFU for the next 43 years and was appointed an emeritus professor in 2008.

Selected publications

References

1943 births
2010 deaths
People from Toronto
Econometricians
University of Wisconsin–Madison alumni
Academic staff of Simon Fraser University